Altaf Khanani (born 2 May 1961) is a Pakistani money launderer who was involved in moving money for terrorist groups and criminal gang groups. After serving three years in prison he was released in July 2020.

Early life and family
He was born in 1961 to Memon family who were originally from Gujarat, India before migrating to Pakistan after independence. His father Abdul Sattar Khanani who was a street dealer and businessman. He was the twin brother of Javed Khanani who was involved in Khanani and Kalia Int. fraud. His brother allegedly committed suicide in 2016.

Money laundering
Khanani's money laundering organisation was involved in the illicit international movement of money between, among others, Pakistan, the United Arab Emirates, United States, United Kingdom, Canada, and Australia. Among the methods used was the traditional Hawala system.  Among others, the organization moved money for drug cartels, biker gangs, Hezbollah, al-Qaida and the armed terrorists behind the Mumbai attacks of 1993 and 2008.

Arrest
He was arrested in Panama and later handed over to the United States. Khanani was arrested in September 2016 by the US Drug Enforcement Administration, and has since remained in jail in the United States. He was indicted in the US District Court of the Southern District of Florida on fourteen counts of money laundering in June 2015. In a plea bargain, Khanani pleaded guilty to a single count of conspiracy to commit laundering and was sentenced to 68 months in prison and a $250,000 fine.

He was also blacklisted by the United States along with his son Obaid Khanani and nephew Hozaifa Khanani. Khanani was released from prison on July 13, 2020. His money laundering network has been designated as a Transnational Criminal Organization under the SDN by the United States Department of the Treasury's Office of Foreign Assets Control, with addresses in Australia, Canada, Pakistan, United Arab Emirates, United Kingdom and United States.

See also
 Khanani & Kalia International, involved in money laundering

References

Living people
1961 births
Pakistani fraudsters
Pakistani people imprisoned abroad
Prisoners and detainees of Florida
Pakistani money launderers
Pakistani people of Gujarati descent
Memon people
People convicted of money laundering
Organised crime in Australia
Pakistani expatriates in the United Arab Emirates
Drug dealers
People from Karachi
Pakistani twins
1993 Bombay bombings
Participants in the 2008 Mumbai attacks

Specially Designated Nationals and Blocked Persons List